Qiu Xinyi (born January 11, 1997, in Taipei, Taiwan) is an idol singer from Tsinchu based in Shanghai. She is a former member of Team SII of female idol group SNH48.

Career
Qiu was unveiled as a first-generation member of SNH48 during an SNH48 press conference on 14 October 2012. On 25 May 2013, she made her first concert appearance during SNH48's "Blooming For You Concert". On 11 November, she became one of the members in SNH48's Team SII. On 12 December, she starred in SNH48 film Mengxiang Yubei Sheng, and on 16 December, she performed on the SNH48 Guangzhou Concert.

On 18 January 2014, Qiu performed in the SNH48 "Red & White Concert". During SNH48's first General Election, held on 26 July, Qiu came in second in place with 14802 votes, behind teammate Wu Zhehan.

On 31 January 2015, she performed during the SNH48 "Request Hour Setlist Best 30 2015". On 28 May, she starred in web drama Lonely Gourmet, based on manga series Kodoku no Gourmet. On 25 July, she took part in SNH48's second General Election, and was ranked 14th with 20078.3 votes. On 31 October, she was announced as part of sub-unit Style-7. On 26 December, she performed at SNH48 "Request Hour Setlist Best 30 2015 (2nd Edition)".

In 2016, she was admitted into Shanghai Theatre Academy.

Discography

With SNH48

EPs

Albums
 Mae Shika Mukanee (2014)

Units

SNH48 Stage Units

Concert units

Filmography

Movies

Dramas

Variety shows

References

External links

1997 births
Living people
SNH48 members
Actresses from Taipei
Taiwanese women singers
Taiwanese film actresses
Taiwanese television actresses
Taiwanese idols
Taiwanese people of Hakka descent
21st-century Taiwanese actresses